Sawantwadi toys refers to hand made works of art made of wood in Sawantwadi a town in Sindhudurg district of Maharashtra, an Indian state. It is reported that the makers of these toys face the challenge of competition from mass-produced cheap Chinese products. A news story dated May, 2013, bemoans the lack of state support to this traditional art form.

Geographical indication registration 
A 2010 news story reports of attempts to obtain Geographical indication registration for the toys.

References 

Sindhudurg district
Wooden toys
Indian handicrafts
Sawantwadi